The Russian concession of Tianjin (Chinese: 天津俄租界, pinyin: Tiānjīn é zūjiè, Russian: Российская концессия Тяньцзиня) was a territory (concession) in the Chinese city of Tientsin occupied colonially by the Russian Empire between 1900 and 1924, and one of the Russian concessions in the late Qing dynasty (others including the Russian concessions in Hankou, Dalian, Harbin, and Port Arthur). The concession is second to the British concession of Tianjin by size, stretching from the coast of the Hai River to the farmlands south of Dazhigu district.

History 
Following the occupation of Tianjin by the Eight Nation Alliance following the Boxer Rebellion in 1900, Russia signed the Tianjin Concession Clause on November 9, 1900, officially delimiting the Russian concession. A brief dispute over the Laolongtou railway station being within the borders of the concession led to negotiations between Britain and Russia in St. Petersburg, leading to Russia giving up the railway station and the road leading to it back to China. Thus, the Russian concession became two parcels of land, the Eastern and Western District. Though the Russian concession was originally the largest concession, occupying a total area of approximately 5971 mu, the British concession soon beat the concession by land size through expansions.

Following the October Revolution, the concession continued to be controlled by the loyalist Russian White movement, though the concession de facto ended when the Beiyang government and the Tianjin police department occupied the concession on September 15, 1920. On August 6th, 1924, the new Soviet government officially relinquished the territory to the Beiyang government, and the concession was transformed into the 3rd district of the Tianjin Special Administrative Region.

Economy 
The Russian concession failed to develop into a prosperous sector or commercial and trading activity, overshadowed by the British concession that became the most important financial district of Tianjin. Some Russian enterprises, like the Russo-Chinese Bank, operated in the British concession instead. Later, the Tianjin-Russian Concession developed into Tianjin's industrial and storage area due to its long river bank and proximity to the Laolongtou railway station, where Texaco, Mobil, and Asia Minor established oil warehouses. In 1919, British American Tobacco also set up factories in the Russian concession.

Gallery

List of consuls 

 Nikolai Vasilievich Laptev (1903–1907)
 Nikolai Maksimovich Poppe (1907–1909)
 Nikolai Sergeievich Muliukin (1909–1910, acting)
 Khristophor Petrovic Kristi (1910–1913)
 Konstantin Viktorovich Uspensky (1913–1914, acting)
 Pyotr Genrikhovich Tiedemann (1914–1920)

See also 

 Concessions in Tianjin
 Concessions of China
 Map of concessions in Tianjin 
 Russian Empire
 List of former foreign enclaves in China

References 

Concessions in China
Former Russian colonies
20th century in Tianjin
History of Tianjin
Former colonies in Asia
European colonisation in Asia